The history of the Ho Chi Minh City Metro includes early plans for the Ho Chi Minh City Metro which ultimately did not go ahead. The current plans which began construction in 2012 is an evolution of the earlier proposals.

Initial 2001 plan 

The original proposal was submitted in 2001 and would consist of six lines.

Priority lines 

Three lines were considered a priority of the 2001 plan, two of them fully or partly underground and one fully elevated:

Proposed extensions to these lines included: extending the Tan Son Nhat line north to Quang Trung Software Park, eventually expanding further to the northwest and southwest to create a much longer 47 km line; extending the Bình Tây/Cholon line to form a circular "Inner Belt" Line, which would loop around the airport; and building a doubletrack elevated express line to extend the Hòa Hưng-Binh Trieu line out to Biên Hòa.

Other lines 

Other lines to be built according to the 2001 plan included a  line connecting Bến Thành Market to Thủ Đức District, via Districts 2 and 9, similar to (but distinct from) Line 1 of the 2007 plan, and a  line from Hòa Hưng in District 10 to Bình Chánh District.

Several more inter-city rail lines were planned, including a Long Binh-Hóc Môn route, a Hóc Môn–Bình Chánh–Tiền Giang route, a Thủ Đức–Long Bình–Long Thành–Vũng Tàu route and a Thủ Thiêm–Long Bình–Vũng Tàu route.

Technical specifications 
The 2001 plan proposed the following technical parameters:
Platform length: 
Average distance between stations 
Maximum speed: 
Headway: 4 min. (min. 2 min.)
Gauge: 
 Vehicle width:

Revised plan in 2007 
The Ho Chi Minh City Metro project is managed by the city's Management Authority for Urban Railways (MAUR), a government unit working directly under the Chairman of the People's Committee of Ho Chi Minh City. The 2007 plan put forth by this unit calls for no less than six urban rail lines. Bến Thành Market in District 1, already a major hub for bus traffic, will become a major hub connecting several lines.

Line 1 

On 10 April 2007, the city government approved the US$1.1 billion Line 1. It will run for 19.7 km from Bến Thành station, underground for 2.6 km past the Opera House, Ba Son Shipyard, and then cross the Saigon River on an elevated track, passing through District 2 on the way to Suối Tiên Park and the terminus in Long Bình in District 9. In total, Line 1 will include 14 stations, with three of these being underground.

Work to build a US$28 million depot in Long Binh for Line 1 began on 21 February 2008. Construction of the elevated section, east of the Saigon River, started in August 2012. The contract for the 3-station underground segment was to follow shortly after. The Japan Bank for International Cooperation will provide US$904.7 million to meet 83% of the cost, and the city government US$186.6 million.

Completion of Line 1 was originally planned for early 2018, but is now planned for 2023. Planners expect the route to serve more than 160,000 passengers daily upon launch, increasing to 635,000 by 2030 and 800,000 by 2040. All stations along the route are expected to accommodate the disabled, with automatic ticket vending machines, telephone booths, restrooms, subway doors and information bulletins accessible to the handicapped and visually impaired.

Line 2 

Plans for the US$1.2 billion Line 2 were submitted in November 2008 by MVA Asia Limited and approved by the government in December 2008. This line will include 11 stations stretching between Bến Thành and Tham Luong in District 12, following a route through Pham Hong Thai, Cach Mang Thang Tam and Trường Chinh streets. Out of the main section's total length of 11.3 km, 9.6 km will be underground. Major stations will include Trường Chinh (Tay Ninh Bus Station), near Tan Son Nhat Airport, and Hòa Hưng, near Saigon Railway Station. An extension of Line 2 east of Bến Thành Market to Thủ Thiêm New was originally proposed by MVA; this extension would bring the line's total length to 19 km.

The project's projected cost will be financed by the German Bank for Reconstruction, the Asian Development Bank and the European Investment Bank. In February 2008, the German government announced EUR 86 million of funding towards the project. Metro line No. 2 was scheduled to start construction in 2013, but due to various difficulties, HCM has asked the Government to delay to 2020. This line is expected to be completed in 2030.

Line 3 
The third metro line would span the distance between Bến Thành Market to the east and An Lac in Bình Tân District to the west, passing through Districts 5 and 6—the area known as Cholon, or "Chinatown". Fewer details have emerged about the third line than the others, although the city's People's Committee is reported to have approached the French government for funding and support. A 2006 document suggested a possible extension of Line 3 north of Bến Thành Market to Thủ Đức District, although officials have yet to confirm whether this extension will be built.

Line 4 
Spanish consulting company Ardanuy Ingenieria won a contract in October 2009 to provide a feasibility study of Line 4 of the six-line project. This line would stretch 16 km from Lang Cha Ca crossroad in Tân Bình District (near Tan Son Nhat Airport) to Van Thanh Park in Bình Thạnh District.

Lines 5-6 
On 4 April 2009, Spain's IDOM, Ingeniería, Arquitectura y Consultoría S.A. signed a contract with HCMC Urban Railway to provide a feasibility study for lines 5 (from Thủ Thiêm, District 2 to Can Giuoc, District 8 – 20 km) and 6 (Ba Queo, Tân Bình to Phu Lam, District 6 – 6 km). The study was to be completed within 12 months.

In September 2010 Spanish company GEV signed an agreement with HCM City's Management Board of Urban Railway to build the first phase of the Metro 5 route between Sai Gon Bridge and Bay Hien Intersection in Tân Bình District. Work on the route is expected to begin by the end of April 2011.

In September 2013 agreement was reached with the Asian Development Bank, the European Investment Bank, and the Spanish Government to provide Euro850m to finance the construction of line 5 - with any additional provided by the Vietnamese Government.  A revised construction start of 2015 was provided.

Other lines 
China Shanghai Corporation for Foreign Economic & Technological Cooperation (Sfeco) has carried out a pre-feasibility study for a 12 km Nguyen Oanh-Nguyen Van Linh Metro route, between Gò Vấp District and District 4. A 2006 document indicated that a subsidiary line connecting the line to Tan Son Nhat Airport and a southward extension to Nhà Bè District may have been considered.

References 
References

Metro
Metro
Rapid transit in Vietnam
Underground rapid transit in Vietnam
Proposed public transport in Asia